Tiwai Point lies at the entrance to Bluff Harbour on the southern coast of the South Island of New Zealand. A spit which extends from the western end of the Awarua Plain, it lies between  Awarua Bay to the north and Foveaux Strait to the south. It is known for the Tiwai Point Aluminium Smelter, one of the largest industrial facilities in New Zealand. In July 2020 Rio Tinto announced plans to close the aluminium smelter in August 2021.

Demographics
Tiwai Point is part of the Woodend-Greenhills statistical area.

Tiwai Rocks Important Bird Area
The rocks at the tip of Tiwai Point have been identified as an Important Bird Area by BirdLife International because they are home to a breeding colony of Foveaux shags.

Foveaux looper moth 
Tiwai Point is one of the two remaining locations where the critically endangered Foveaux looper moth lives. A. frivola is at high risk of extinction, and has already disappeared from one of its three known localities. Its main population exists on an area at Tiwai Point of less than 25 m² of coastal vegetation.

Causeway accident 
In 1980, a vehicle with 10 people failed to take a turn on the Tiwai Point causeway, crashing through a barrier and falling into the water. Seven people died, including five who were never recovered.

References

Headlands of Southland, New Zealand
Spits of New Zealand
Important Bird Areas of New Zealand
Bluff, New Zealand
Foveaux Strait
Invercargill